Monolake is a German electronic music project, initially consisting of members Gerhard Behles and Robert Henke, Monolake is now perpetuated by Henke while Behles focuses on running music software company Ableton, which they founded in 1999 together with Bernd Roggendorf. From 2004, Torsten Pröfrock became a member of Monolake.

Monolake's minimal, dub-influenced techno helped establish the sound of the Chain Reaction label, also located in Berlin, subsequently using their own [ml/i] (Monolake / Imbalance Computer Music) label for the group's output. Both current members have solo projects, with Henke releasing under his own name and Pröfrock as "T++" and "Various Artists."

In 2008, T++ followed Ricardo Villalobos in bridging the gap between minimal techno and dubstep, by remixing Shackleton's Death Is Not Final for the Skull Disco label.

In 2009, Robert Henke appeared in the electronic music documentary, Speaking In Code, which presented the completion of the Monodeck. As of 2012, Henke has been designing a new form of live show syncing surround-sound audio stems with visual loops, allowing for improvisation.

Monolake is named after Mono Lake, which is east of the Sierra Nevada in California.

Monodeck

Henke is a software engineer who develops custom software and hardware for live performances. As well as working as an engineer for Ableton, Henke designed the Atlantic Waves software for performing live with other producers in different countries simultaneously.

In 2003, Henke designed the Monodeck, a MIDI-controller interface for spontaneous editing and effects work during live performances, even without having to look at the computer screen. The Monodeck and its successor, Monodeck II, control Ableton Live through special software designed with Max/MSP.

Discography

Monolake albums
 Hongkong (Chain Reaction, 1997, re-issued remastered and re-edited in 2008)
 Gobi. The Desert EP ([ml/i], 1999)
 Interstate ([ml/i], 1999 re-issued in 2007)
 Cinemascope ([ml/i], 2001)
 Gravity ([ml/i], 2001)
 Momentum ([ml/i], 2003)
 Polygon_Cities ([ml/i], 2005)
 Plumbicon Versions ([ml/i], 2006)
 Silence ([ml/i], 2009)
 Ghosts ([ml/i], 2012)
 VLSI (2016)
 Archaeopteryx (2020)

Robert Henke albums
 Piercing Music (Imbalance, 1994, re-released 2003)
 Floating Point (Imbalance, 1997)
 Signal to Noise (Imbalance Computer Music, 2004)
 Layering Buddha (Imbalance Computer Music, 2006) also released as a 5 x 7" box set
 Atom/Document (Imbalance Computer Music, 2008)
 Indigo_Transform (Imbalance Computer Music, 2009)

Torsten Pröfrock albums
 Various Artists Decay Product (Chain Reaction, 1997)
 Various Artists 8, 8.5, 9 Remixes (FatCat, 1999)
 Dynamo Außen Vor (DIN, 2002)

References

External links

 monolake.de - official website
 
 Monolake / Imbalance Computer Music at Discogs.com

German electronic music groups
Intelligent dance musicians
Ableton Live users
Musical groups from Berlin